Carlos Ramos Núñez (15 September 1960 – 21 September 2021) was a Peruvian jurist and academic. He was a justice of the Constitutional Court from 2014 until his death.

References 

1960 births
2021 deaths
Peruvian jurists
Catholic University of Santa María alumni
Pontifical Catholic University of Peru alumni
Academic staff of the Pontifical Catholic University of Peru
Academic staff of the National University of San Marcos
Academic staff of the University of Buenos Aires
People from Arequipa